The Best of Friends is a compilation album (9th release) by singer-songwriter duo Loggins and Messina, released in late 1976.

It consists of 10 of their most popular and best loved songs in what is essentially a "greatest hits" LP.

The CD release featured the same tracks as the original 1976 LP; "Angry Eyes" is still the edited version and no additional tracks were added to fill the CD to the 80-minute limit.

Track listing
Side One
"Angry Eyes" (Kenny Loggins, Jim Messina) – 2:23
"Be Free" (Messina) – 6:57
"Vahevala" (Daniel Loggins, Dann Lottermoser) – 4:45
"Peace of Mind" (Messina) – 4:04
"My Music" (Loggins, Messina) – 3:03

Side Two
"Thinking of You" (Messina) – 2:18
"House at Pooh Corner" (Loggins) – 4:20
"Watching the River Run" (Loggins, Messina) – 3:25
"Danny's Song" (Loggins) – 4:14
"Your Mama Don't Dance" (Loggins, Messina) – 2:47

Personnel
Kenny Loggins – vocals, background vocals, rhythm guitar, acoustic guitar, harmonica
Jim Messina – vocals, background vocals, lead guitar, acoustic guitar, mandolin, dobro
Merel Bregante – drums, backing vocals
Jon Clarke – flute, oboe, recorder, baritone, soprano & tenor saxophones, steel drum
Victor Feldman – percussion
Al Garth – fiddle, recorder, alto & tenor saxophones, steel drum
Milt Holland – percussion
Michael Omartian – organ, piano, keyboards, clavinet, concertina, steel drum
David Paich – keyboards
Larry Sims – bass, vocals, backing vocals

Production
Producer: Jim Messina
Engineers: Alex Kazanegras, John Fiore
Photography: Annie Leibovitz
Design: Ken Anderson
Liner notes: Kenny Loggins, Jim Messina

Charts

References

Best of Friends, The
Best of Friends, The
Columbia Records compilation albums
Albums produced by Jim Messina (musician)
Albums produced by Kenny Loggins